Ede-Wageningen is a railway station located in Ede, Netherlands. It is situated on the Amsterdam–Arnhem railway and the  Nijkerk–Ede-Wageningen railway. The station is the main Intercity station, but is not in the centre of the town. The station also serves Wageningen, a city 8 km to the south of Ede.

History
The station opened on 16 May 1845 on the Amsterdam–Arnhem railway as the Ede-Rhijnspoor station. The railway was originally planned to run via Wageningen instead of Ede, but this did not go ahead. Until 1937 there was a tram service from Ede to Wageningen, but this was replaced at that time by a bus service. This is when the station changed to Ede-Wageningen.

In 2022 major construction started on completely replacing the outdated building with a much more modern, useful and friendly train station. The new station is expected to be finished in 2024, with the area around the station following a year later.

Train services
, the following local train services call at this station:
Express services:
Intercity: Den Helder - Amsterdam - Utrecht - Nijmegen
Intercity: Schiphol - Utrecht - Nijmegen
Local services
Sprinter: Ede-Wageningen - Arnhem
Stoptrein: Amersfoort - Ede-Wageningen

References

External links

NS website 
Dutch public transport travel planner 

Railway stations in Ede, Netherlands
Railway stations opened in 1845
Railway stations on the Rhijnspoorweg
Railway stations on the Valleilijn
1845 establishments in the Netherlands
Railway stations in the Netherlands opened in 1845